Pee Pee Township is one of the fourteen townships of Pike County, Ohio, United States.  The 2000 census found 7,776 people in the township, including 4,433 people in the village of Waverly, and 3,343 in the unincorporated portions of the township.

Geography
Located in the northern part of the county, it borders the following townships:
Franklin Township, Ross County – northeast
Jackson Township – east
Seal Township – southeast
Newton Township – southwest
Pebble Township – west
Huntington Township, Ross County – northwest

The village of Waverly, the county seat of Pike County, is located in eastern Pee Pee Township.

The  Lake White State Park is also located in this township.

History
Pee Pee Township was organized in 1798 as the first township in Pike County. The township takes its name from Pee Pee Creek; which was so named when an early settler inscribed his initials P. P. on a tree along its banks. Pee Pee Township has been noted for its unusual place name. Its name is very similar to the slang term "peepee," which is referred to the human penis or sometimes urine.

Government
The township is governed by a three-member board of trustees, who are elected in November of odd-numbered years to a four-year term beginning on the following January 1. Two are elected in the year after the presidential election and one is elected in the year before it. There is also an elected township fiscal officer, who serves a four-year term beginning on April 1 of the year after the election, which is held in November of the year before the presidential election. Vacancies in the fiscal officership or on the board of trustees are filled by the remaining trustees.

References

External links
Henry Howe, "Pike County," Historical Collections of Ohio, 1888.
"Pike County Townships & Communities"
Pike County visitors bureau website

Townships in Pike County, Ohio
Townships in Ohio